Du gör mig hel igen (Swedish: "you make me whole again") was an entry in Melodifestivalen 1997, which was sung by Cajsalisa Ejemyr. Songwriter and part producer of the song was popstar Robin Carlsson (Robyn). The song placed 4th in the contest, and later entered the Swedish charts.

Charts

References

SMDB

Melodifestivalen songs of 1997
Swedish pop songs
Songs written by Robyn
Songs written by Ulf Lindström
Songs written by Johan Ekhé
1997 songs
Warner Music Group singles